During the 2006–07 Italian football season, Udinese Calcio competed in Serie A.

Season summary
Manager Giovanni Galeone was sacked on 16 January after disagreements with the club. He was replaced by Alberto Malesani, who led the club to an unimpressive 10th place in the final table. His contract was not extended at the end of the season, and Pasquale Marino was signed from Catania as his replacement.

Competitions

Serie A

First-team squad
Squad at end of season

Left club during season

References

Udinese Calcio seasons

Udinese Calcio
2006–07 in Italian football